Chinthamani Kolacase is a 2006 Indian Malayalam-language action legal thriller film directed by Shaji Kailas with Suresh Gopi in the lead role and Bhavana playing the central character, this film narrates the story of a Lal Krishna Viradiyar, a psychotic-daredevil lawyer, who provides verdict in his style of law enforcement for the criminals after the court sessions.

The style of the movie is non-linearity that is maintained throughout the entire film. The basic story-telling style of Shaji Kailas is spun on and off by the writer A. K. Sajan. It was remade in Telugu as Sri Mahalakshmi and remade in Tamil as Ellam Avan Seyal. The core storyline was also used in the Kannada movie Aptha.

Plot
Lal Krishna Viradiyar is a daredevil and psychotic criminal lawyer with an even more enigmatic mission. Lal Krishna assists hardened criminals to escape from the courts by efficiently managing the case, and stating lack of evidence. Post-acquittal, he pursues and takes them out in a bizarre show of vigilante justice. Isra Khureshi, who accused of killing his Arabic teacher Rasiya, invites Lal Krishna as his lawyer, asking him to join for a party at his farmhouse for celebrating the success. Lal Krishna arrives at the spot and kills Khureshi, claiming that it is his duty to wipe out evil forces to maintain law and order. Later, Lal Krishna kills David Rajarathnam, a Tamil Nadu-based gangster, who was accused of assaulting his daughter. 

ASP Jagannivasan, is suspicious of Lal Krisnan's moves, and has been closely observing him for a long time. Lal Krishna takes up the case of Mirchi girls, a band of spoilt, rich NRI's, who are accused in the ragging and murder of Chinthamani, their college mate, an innocent girl from a conservative background. Chinthamani's father Veeramani Warrier is fighting hard for justice and is represented by public prosecutor Kannayi Parameshwaran, who is famous for his unique style of argument. After a long court battle, Lal Krishna succeeds in bringing the judgement in favor of Mirchi Girls. L.K finds out that Kannayi Parameshwaran and college principal Dr. KIM Sudarshan are actually Chinthamani's killers. Kannayi is a silent partner in the private medical college, who killed Chinthamani. 

Chinthamani was sent to Sudarshan's house by her conniving hostel warden, and was asked to withdraw her admission from the medical college, where she resists to comply, but Kannayi kills her, and place charges on the Mirchi Girls for the inhumane act. In his self-styled violent methods, Lal Krishna kills Kannayi and Sudarshan to deliver justice to Chinthamani and Veeramani Warrier. Though aware of the entire scenario, Jagannivasan is unable to arrest Lal Krishna, due to lack of evidence and leaves him with a small admiration for the latter.

Cast
Suresh Gopi as Adv. Lal Krishna Viradiyar/LK
Bhavana as Chinthamani Warrier, a college girl
 Thilakan as Veeramani Warrier
 Biju Menon as ASP Jagannathan IPS
 Kalabhavan Mani as CI Ayyappadas
 Vani Viswanath as Adv. Pattammal
 Sai Kumar as Adv. Kannayi Parameswaran
 Maniyanpilla Raju as CI Bava
 Vijayakumar as Krishnankutty Warrier
 Prem Prakash as Dr. Kim Sudarshan
 Baburaj as Isra Khureshi
 Bheeman Raghu as David Rajarathnam
 Anil Murali as Satheeshan, Police Officer
 Balachandran Chullikkadu as Swaminathan Master
 Vinayakan as Uchandi the Beggar
 T. P. Madhavan as Adv. Manishankar Iyer
 Jibin Thomas (achayan)
 Poornima Anand as Volga Mariadas, Caretaker of ladies hostel 'America'
 Aishwarya Ajit
 Deepika Mohan
 Jisna Ali as Thara Sundaram
 Rekha as Gajalakshmi, LK's sister
 Biju Pappan as Sundaram

Reception

This film was released a few months after the success of Shaji Kailas - Suresh Gopi team's The Tiger. Chinthamani Kolacase went on become one of the biggest money grosser of the year 2006. This film also  reaffirmed the chair of Shaji Kailas and Suresh Gopi in Malayalam cinema. The script of this film was done by A. K. Sajan, who had earlier done films like Butterflies, Janathipathyam, Crime File and Stop Violence.

Box office
The film was commercial success. The film ran for 100 days in major centres of its release.

Remakes
It was remade in Telugu as Sri Mahalakshmi starring Srihari and remade in Tamil as Ellam Avan Seyal with same director. Newcomer RK plays Lal Krishna and actress Bhama plays Chinthamani in the Tamil version and Srihari is L.K. and Shamna plays Sri Mahalakshmi in the Telugu version. The core storyline was also used in the Kannada movie Aptha.

References

External links
 

2006 films
Indian legal films
2000s Malayalam-language films
Malayalam films remade in other languages
Films about organised crime in India
Films about rape in India
Indian crime thriller films
Fictional portrayals of the Kerala Police
Indian vigilante films
Films shot in Palakkad
Films about lawyers
Films directed by Shaji Kailas